The Rivera Transform Fault, also referred to as the Rivera Fracture Zone, is a right lateral-moving (dextral) transform fault which lies along the seafloor of the Pacific Ocean off the west coast of Mexico just south of the mouth of the Gulf of California.  It runs between two segments of the East Pacific Rise, forming the southwest boundary of the small Rivera Plate.  The fault is broken into two segments, bisected by a short rifting zone.

References

Geography of Mexico
Geology of Mexico
Seismic faults of Mexico
Seismic zones of Mexico
Pacific Coast of Mexico
Plate tectonics